The 1924 Michigan Agricultural Aggies football team represented Michigan Agricultural College (MAC) as an independent during the 1924 college football season. In their second year under head coach Ralph H. Young, the Aggies compiled a 5–3 record and outscored their opponents 210 to 48.

Schedule

Game summaries

Michigan

On October 11, 1924, the Aggies hosted Michigan in East Lansing. The game remained scoreless through the first three quarters. Michigan scored on a pass from halfback Frederick Parker to end Herb Steger to win the game by a 7 to 0 score. The 1925 Michiganensian described the play as follows: "In the last few minutes of play, Parker threw one of the long sensational passes that characterized the Wolverine's attack throughout the entire season, to Captain Steger who caught it and ran for a touchdown." According to The New York Times, Michigan center Robert J. Brown "was credited with an outstanding performance in the line."

References

Michigan Agricultural
Michigan State Spartans football seasons
Michigan Agricultural Aggies football